Sattar (missile) is an Iranian laser-guided air-to-ground missile, which have been mentioned for utilizing on the fighters of "F-4 and F-5" in Islamic Republic of Iran Air Force, and is said "have been a sort of complement of the weapons of Islamic Republic of Iran's bomber fighters. This missile's name have been applied based on the name of Mansour Sattari, who was the Commander-in-Chief of the Islamic Republic of Iran Air Force. This missile is considered as the first laser guided Iran-made missile.

This air-to-ground missile consists of 3 types of it, namely: Sattar-1, Sattar-2 and Sattar-3 (as the project of Asr-67). The Sattar-1 missile is a short/medium range missile, but there is no information concerning its speed. Sattar-2 is a significantly improved form of its previous version; Sattar-3 is also the newest version of Sattar laser-guided missile, which is said to have a warhead with 225 kg.

See also 
 List of military equipment manufactured in Iran
 Islamic Republic of Iran Air Force

References

Air-to-surface missiles of Iran
Islamic Republic of Iran Air Force
Guided bombs